Diego Lima may refer to:

 Diego Lima (footballer, born 1986), Brazilian football goalkeeper
 Diego Lima (footballer, born 1990), Brazilian football goalkeeper
 Diego Lima (footballer, born 1988), Brazilian football midfielder

See also
 Dhiego Lima (born 1989), Brazilian mixed martial artist